Alton Square Mall is a   shopping mall located in Alton, Illinois. Its anchor store is JCPenney. A second anchor structure formerly housed a Sears, and currently houses an eight screen NCG Cinemas theater, while a third anchor structure, housing a Macy's, was demolished in 2017.

History
The mall was built by The May Department Stores Company and groundbreaking began in 1976. The Famous-Barr anchor store, a division of May, was the first portion of the mall to open, on October 16, 1978. The remainder of the mall, including the J. C. Penney anchor store, opened on November 15, 1978. It was later sold to May Centers, Inc., the mall development arm of May Department Stores. They subsequently sold it to CenterMark Properties Inc. of St. Louis, which sold it to Melvin Simon and Associates of Indianapolis in February 1993. A third anchor structure, Sears, was added during a renovation in 1997.

The Famous-Barr anchor store was converted to Macy's in 2006. Simon Property Group Inc. sold the mall to Coyote Management of Texas in 2007.

In 2009, a 10-screen Premiere Cinemas theater was announced for the mall, but it did not open.

Coyote Management sold the mall to NorthMarq Capital in 2010.

In April 2012, it was announced that Sears would close as part of a plan to expand the stores to make way for the Hayner Public Library. Sears closed on June 3, 2012. Sears was converted to Illinois Wholesale Furniture, which also soon closed. 

In 2015, NorthMarq sold the mall to Hull Property Group. That same year, a Ross Dress For Less store was added, along with Hibbett Sports.

In March 2017, Family Christian Stores closed, and Hull Property Group announced a redevelopment of the mall. The old Sears site would be made into a movie theater. Macy's, which also closed in 2017, was demolished, leaving JCPenney and Ross Dress for Less as the only anchor stores left. As part of the redevelopment, the smaller stores from the second level would be moved to the first level so they could have room for 5 anchor stores. In May 2017, the mall announced that Hallmark and Things Remembered would both be closing their locations inside the mall. On November 22, Vitamin World announced they would close all their St. Louis area stores, including the Alton Square Mall location and the food court. Over the years, the mall continued to struggle with store after store closing. In February 2019, Slackers CDs and Games announced it would be moving to the Christian bookstore's former space from elsewhere in Alton.  In April 2021, the NCG Cinema was added in the old Sears space, becoming the third anchor of Alton Square Mall.

References

External links

Alton, Illinois
Hull Property Group
Shopping malls in Illinois
Shopping malls established in 1978
1978 establishments in Illinois
Tourist attractions in Madison County, Illinois